Boscarino is an Italian surname. Notable people with the surname include:

 Lisa Boscarino (born 1961), Puerto-Rican judoka
 Salvatore Boscarino (1925–2001), Italian architect and cultural historian
 Samantha Boscarino (born 1994), American actress

Italian-language surnames